Maurice Rinfret (6 March 1915 – 26 December 1967) was a Liberal party member of the House of Commons of Canada. He was born in Montreal, Quebec and became a businessman and trader by career.

He was first elected at the Saint-Jacques riding in the 1962 general election after an unsuccessful bid for the seat in 1958. Rinfret was re-elected there in 1963 and 1965, but died in office before completing his term in the 27th Canadian Parliament.

Rinfret was a chief assistant to the government Whip from 1963 to 1967.

External links
 

1915 births
1967 deaths
Businesspeople from Montreal
Liberal Party of Canada MPs
Members of the House of Commons of Canada from Quebec
Politicians from Montreal